Pannoparmelia is a genus of lichenised ascomycetes in the large family Parmeliaceae. It is a genus of five currently accepted species. Pannoparmelia species have a foliose growth habit. All members of the family have a symbiotic association with green alga and the majority of Parmeliaceae species have foloiose. The morphological diversity is enormous within this group and the specimen are difficult to identify in its species level. There are a range of habitats and climatic regions within this family and it includes tropical rainforest trees to subshrubs in Artic tundra.[3]

Etymology
The name Pannoparmelia comes from the Latin term pannosus, which means 'felt-like texture'. This is a reference to the noticeably spongy thallus exhibited by species in this genus.

References

3. “Arne Thell, Ana Crespo, Pradeep K. Divakar, Ingvar Kärnefelt, Steven D. Leavitt, H. Thorsten Lumbsch, Mark R. D. Seaward” A review of the lichen family Parmeliaceae – history, phylogeny and current taxonomy. (2012). Nordic Journal of Botany., 30(6), 641–664. https://doi.org/10.1111/j.1756-1051.2012.00008.x

External links
Pannoparmelia angustata at the Hidden Forest
Pannoparmelia at the online Flora of New Zealand - Lichens - Revised 2nd Edition (2007)
Pannoparmelia at the online Flora of New Zealand - Lichens (1985)

Parmeliaceae
Lichen genera
Lecanorales genera
Taxa named by Johannes Müller Argoviensis
Taxa described in 1889